John William Hill (born 4 July 1895) was an English footballer who played for Rochdale when they joined the English Football League in 1921.

He also played for Bright's and Bacup Borough.

References

Rochdale A.F.C. players
Bacup Borough F.C. players
English footballers
Footballers from Rochdale
Association football wingers
1895 births
Year of death missing